Arthur Bettez (28 December 1871 – 4 January 1931) was a Canadian politician from Quebec, Canada.

He was born in Trois-Rivières, Mauricie and became an accountant by trade. From 1923 to 1931 he was Mayor of Trois-Rivières.

Bettez ran as a Liberal candidate in the district of Three Rivers and St. Maurice in the 1925 federal election and won.  He was re-elected in 1926 and 1930, then in 1931 died in office.

References

1871 births
1931 deaths
Liberal Party of Canada MPs
Mayors of Trois-Rivières
Members of the House of Commons of Canada from Quebec